Machar is a rural locality (a selo) in Chadakolobsky Selsoviet, Tlyaratinsky District, Republic of Dagestan, Russia. The population was 100 as of 2010.

Geography 
Machar is located 16 km north of Tlyarata (the district's administrative centre) by road. Kabasida is the nearest rural locality.

References 

Rural localities in Tlyaratinsky District